is a Japanese television series broadcast by NHK. The pilot episode first aired on 25 August 2012, while the series proper began airing on 6 April 2013.

Introduction
In this program, animation, CG and scientific experiments present diversified, original views of world music and various genres. It was intended to stimulate interest in music among children, and to nurture interest in art.

Story

Character
Mark Dottore (Kenta Hamano)
A Musica Doctor; he plays the trombone.
Arina (Saito Arina)
She is an apprentice Musica Doctor. She plays guitar.
Arvelt (Yasutomo Yamaguchi)
He is an apprentice Musica Doctor. He plays keyboard instruments such as piano.
Pepe (Sankon Jr.)
He is the engineer of the ship. He plays percussion and drums.
Narrator (Lily Franky)

External links
  

Japanese children's television series
2013 Japanese television series debuts
NHK original programming